David Levovich Gatikoyev (born 14 September 1993) is a Russian football forward.

Club career
Gatikoyev made his debut in the Russian Second Division for FC Alania-d Vladikavkaz on 26 April 2011 in a game against FC Mashuk-KMV Pyatigorsk and scored a goal on his debut.

Gatikoyev made his Russian Football National League debut for FC SKA-Energiya Khabarovsk on 11 July 2015 in a game against FC Luch-Energiya Vladivostok.

On 6 February 2020, Gatikoyev signed for Armenian Premier League club Alashkert.

References

External links

1993 births
Living people
Footballers from Moscow
Russian footballers
Russian expatriate footballers
Association football forwards
FC Spartak Vladikavkaz players
FC SKA-Khabarovsk players
FC Minsk players
FC Alashkert players
Russian Second League players
Russian First League players
Belarusian Premier League players
Armenian Premier League players
Russian expatriate sportspeople in Belarus
Russian expatriate sportspeople in Armenia
Expatriate footballers in Belarus
Expatriate footballers in Armenia